Dahil sa Pag-ibig ( / International title: For Love or Money) is a 2019 Philippine television drama suspense series broadcast by GMA Network. It premiered on the network's Afternoon Prime line up and worldwide via GMA Pinoy TV on May 20, 2019, replacing Inagaw na Bituin.

NUTAM (Nationwide Urban Television Audience Measurement) People in Television Homes ratings are provided by AGB Nielsen Philippines while Kantar Media Philippines provide Nationwide ratings (Urban + Rural).

The series ended, but it's the 20th-week run, and with 100 episodes. It was replaced by  Madrasta.

Series overview

Episodes

May 2019

June 2019

July 2019

August 2019

September 2019

October 2019

References

Lists of Philippine drama television series episodes